Khatoo or Khatu is a village of religious importance near Reengus town in Sikar District of Rajasthan, India. Sikar district falls under the Dhundhar region of Rajasthan. Khatoo village is home to a famous Khatu Shyam Temple, one of the most sacred temples in India. In Rajasthan, Hindu deity Barbarika is worshipped as Khatu Shyam.

Distances

Sikar: 55 km
Shrimadhopur: 33 km 
Jaipur: 80 km
New Delhi: 266 km
 
Indore: 680 km 
Jabalpur: 1000 km
Jeenmata: 26 km 
Salasar Balaji:105
Mumbai : 1250 km 
Kolkata : 1592 km 
Hyderabad : 1775 km 
Nagpur : 1200 km 
Guwahati :2300 km 
Varanasi : 940 km 
Ahmedabad : 720 km
The nearest airport is Jaipur.

Features

Khatushyamji Temple
Khatushyamji's temple, constructed of the famous Makrana marble, is in the heart of the town. The temple of Baba Shyam is built in the middle of the town. The mere sight of the temple gives great peace to the mind. There is a big hall for worship in the temple, which is known as Jagmohan. There are mythological paintings on its four walls. The door of the sanctum sanctorum and its surroundings are decorated with silver lining. Baba's head is situated inside the sanctum sanctorum. Sheesh is decorated with beautiful flowers from all sides. There is a big ground outside the temple for the devotees. There is a fair ground on the right side of the temple. On this side the office of Shyam Mandir Committee, which handles the administration of the temple, is also located.
Veer Barbarik(Shyam Baba) is the son of Dvapara Yuga Bhimsen and Naag Kanya Ahilawati(daughter of Basak/Basuki Naag). Khatushyamji is considered to be the God of the Kali Yuga who shall perform incarnation (10th incarnation of Lord Vishnu) or an avatar, once the Kali Yuga is at its final stage, until then he was worshipped as KhatuShyamji. Shyamji is synonymous with Krishna and thus, he is worshipped in the same form. He is also known as khatu naresh(ruler of Khatu), sheesh ro dani (head donator), lakhdatar (one who gives after proper judgement), teen baan dhari(holder of three arrows), haarya ro sahhaaro (supporter of defeated), Ahilawati ro laal (son of Ahilawati), Pandav kul Avtar (Son of Pandav kul), Bhimsen ra Kanwar (grand son of Raja Bhim), leele ra aswar (rider of horse named Leela), baba shyam, etc. Shyam Baba is the community god of the Marwaris from the Dhundhar, Shekhawati, Bagad, Ahirwati and Haryana area and is widely revered by many other communities also. People from all over India come to seek his blessings every year, with a large following from Kolkata, West Bengal, Haryana and Punjab
During the Mahabharat war between Pandavas and Kaurvas, baba Shyam (Veer Barbrik) came to the war field with 3 baan (arrows) and Shree Krishna, even knowing his potential asked him reason for his arrival at war field with only 3 arrows and asked to prove his capabilities by targeting all leaves of a Pipal tree(having uncountable leaves) with just one arrow and placed one leaf under his own feet. Baba took the bow and an arrow and made a hole in all leaves with one arrow and also hit the leaf under the foot of Lord Krishna. On asking to whom he will support in the Mahabharat,  veer Barbrik told that he will support the one being defeated. Then considering his such act to be against the Pandavas scope to win,  Lord Krishna asked him that the war needs one stringent fighters sacrifice (only 3 such fighters being available – Krishan himself, Arjun and Barbrik), Baba offered himself for ultimate sacrifice and donated his head that's why reminded and worshipped in Kali Yuga as "sheesh ke daani & haare ka sahara", as announced by Lord Krishna and also the name Shyam was given by Lord Krishna.

Shyam Kund
It is the holy pond near the temple from which the Sheesh (Head) was retrieved. It is believed that a dip in this pond cures a person from ailments and brings good health. People come at Falgun Mela from various places here and assume sacred after taking bath. People take water from here which they use to remove several diseases.

Shyam Bagicha
A blessed garden near the temple from where the flowers are picked to be offered to the deity. The great devotee Lt. Alu Singhji's Samadhi is also in the premises.

Gourishankar Temple
This is a Shiva temple which is near Khatushyamji's temple. There is a legend that the Mughal emperor Aurangzeb's soldiers wanted to destroy this temple, and attacked the Shiva Linga with a spear. Fountains of blood appeared from the Shiva Linga, and the soldiers ran away, terrified. One can still see the mark of the spear on the Linga.

References 
2. [Khatu shyam ji] website

Hindu holy cities
Villages in Sikar district